"Toot It and Boot It" is the debut song by American rapper YG, taken from his second mixtape The Real 4Fingaz (2010). The song was officially released as YG's commercial debut single on June 8, 2010, by Def Jam Recordings. The song features vocals and production from Los Angeles-based singer Ty Dolla Sign (credited as Ty$). The song peaked at number 67 on the US Billboard Hot 100 and number 12 on the US Hot Rap Songs chart. An official remix and its music video was released, which features the original artists, as well as rappers 50 Cent and Snoop Dogg. The song features samples of Songs In the Wind by The Association, part of their 1966 album Renaissance (albeit slowed down and in a lower pitch). The track was sampled on "Young, Wild & Free" by Snoop Dogg, Wiz Khalifa and Bruno Mars.

Charts

Weekly charts

Year-end charts

Certifications

References

External links
 

2009 songs
2010 debut singles
YG (rapper) songs
Ty Dolla Sign songs
Def Jam Recordings singles
Dirty rap songs
Songs written by Ty Dolla Sign
Songs written by YG (rapper)

2010 singles